The documented history of philosophy is often said to begin with the notable death of Socrates.  Since that time, there have been many other noteworthy deaths of philosophers.

List
475 BCE - Neanthes of Cyzicus reported that Heraclitus died covered in dung after failing to cure himself of dropsy.
458 BCE – Zeno of Elea, according to Valerius Maximus, was tortured and killed by the tyrant Nearchus, after biting off the tyrant's ear.
435 BCE – According to legend, Empedocles leapt to his death into the crater of Etna.
420 BCE – According to some reports, Protagoras died in a shipwreck.
399 BCE – Socrates, condemned to death for corrupting the young, drank hemlock amongst his friends as described in Plato’s Phaedo.
348 BCE – Plato either died while being serenaded by a Thracian flute-playing girl, at a wedding feast, or in his sleep.
338 BCE – According to legend, Isocrates starved himself to death.
323 BCE – Accounts differ regarding the death of Diogenes of Sinope. He is alleged to have died from eating raw octopus, from being bitten by a dog, and from holding his breath. He left instructions for his corpse to be left outside the city walls as a feast for the animals and birds.
320 BCE – Ancient sources state that Nicocreon the tyrant had Anaxarchus pounded to death in a mortar with iron pestles; Anaxarchus is said to have made light of the punishment.
314 BCE – Xenocrates died when he hit his head after tripping over a bronze pot.
270 BCE – Epicurus died of kidney stones.
262 BCE – Zeno of Citium founder of the Stoic philosophical school tripped and broke his toe and then died from holding his breath.
212 BCE – Archimedes killed during the Siege of Syracuse by a Roman soldier despite orders that he should not be harmed.
207 BCE – Chrysippus is said to have died from laughter after giving wine to his donkey and seeing it attempt to eat figs.
52 BCE – Lucretius is alleged to have killed himself after being driven mad by taking a love potion. (Debated).
43 BCE – Cicero while leaving his villa in Formiae was beheaded by two killers, allegedly sent by Marcus Antonius.
65 CE – Seneca was forced to commit suicide after falling out with Emperor Nero.
415 – Hypatia was lynched by a mob of Christians.
430 – Saint Augustine died in Hippo while the city was under siege by the Vandals.
526 – Boethius was strangled on the orders of the Ostrogoth king Theodoric by whom he was employed.
1141 – Judah Halevi was killed on a pilgrimage to Jerusalem.
1180 – Abraham ibn Daud was martyred.
1277 – Pope John XXI (usually identified with the logician Peter of Spain) was killed by the collapse of a roof.
1284 – Siger of Brabant was stabbed to death by his clerk.
1415 – Jan Hus was executed at the Council of Constance.
1487 – John Argyropoulos supposedly died of consuming too much watermelon.
1535 – Thomas More was executed by beheading in 1535 after he had fallen out of favour with King Henry VIII.
1572 – Girolamo Maggi was executed by strangulation on the orders of a prison captain in Constantinople; Maggi had been incarcerated after being arrested during the Turkish siege of Famagusta.
1572 – Peter Ramus was killed in the St. Bartholomew’s Day Massacre.
1600 – Giordano Bruno was burnt by the Inquisition.
1619 – Lucilio Vanini was also burnt by the Inquisition.
1626 – Francis Bacon died of pneumonia, contracted while stuffing snow into a chicken as an experiment in refrigeration.
1640 – Uriel da Costa, after being beaten and trampled by a religious group he had offended, went home and shot himself.
1650 – René Descartes was killed by a cold acquired through his rising early to instruct Queen Christina of Sweden.
1677 – Baruch Spinoza died of a pulmonary ailment, thought to be either tuberculosis or silicosis, brought on by inhaling glass dust while working as a lens grinder.
1683 – Algernon Sidney was executed for treason.
1716 – Gottfried Wilhelm Leibniz died in Hanover on 14 November 1716 after a prolonged case of arthritis and gout. The only one to attend his funeral was his secretary, Johann Georg von Eckhart.
1794 – The Marquis de Condorcet died in prison.
1814 – Johann Gottlieb Fichte died of typhus in Berlin, during the campaign against Napoleon.
1831 – Georg Wilhelm Friedrich Hegel died of a gastrointestinal disease during a cholera outbreak in Berlin.
1837 – Giacomo Leopardi died in Naples during a cholera epidemic, maybe by pulmonary edema.
1864 – Ferdinand Lassalle died in a duel. 
1866 – William Whewell was thrown from his horse and sustained fatal injuries.
1876 – Philipp Mainländer hanged himself in his residence in Offenbach
1882 – William Jevons was drowned while bathing.
1900 – Friedrich Nietzsche died after a mental breakdown.
1901 – Paul Rée fell to his death from a mountain.
1903 – Otto Weininger committed suicide by shooting himself.
1906 – Ludwig Boltzmann hanged himself.
1910 – Carlo Michelstaedter killed himself with a pistol he had in his house.
1911 – Paul Lafargue died with his wife, Laura Marx, in a suicide pact.
1915 – Emil Lask was killed in action as soldier in World War I.
1916 – J. Howard Moore shot himself in Jackson Park, Chicago.
1917 – Adolf Reinach fell outside Diksmuide in Flanders during World War I.
1919 – Rosa Luxemburg was murdered by the Freikorps. 
1924 – Vladimir Lenin died of a brain hemorrhage.  
1928 – Alexander Bogdanov died as a result of one of his experiments in blood transfusion.
1930 – Frank P. Ramsey died after "contracting jaundice" at the age of 26. (Jaundice by itself is not a cause of death but instead indicates hemolytic or hepatic disease.)
1931 – Jacques Herbrand died in a mountaineering accident in the Alps at the age of 23.
1936 – Moritz Schlick was murdered by an insane student.
1937 – Gustav Shpet was executed after being accused of involvement in an anti-Soviet organization.
1937 – Pavel Florensky was shot dead after being sentenced by an extrajudicial NKVD troika to death.  
1937 – Antonio Gramsci died during his imprisonment by Benito Mussolini.
1939 – Stanisław Ignacy Witkiewicz committed suicide by taking an overdose of Veronal and trying to slit his wrists a day after the Soviet invasion of Poland; it was planned to be a joint suicide with a close friend of his  but she survived the attempt.
1940 – Walter Benjamin committed suicide at the Spanish-French border, after attempting to flee from the Nazis.
1940 – Leon Trotsky was assassinated on Stalin's orders in Mexico, by Soviet agent Ramón Mercader, along with most of his family.
1941 – Henri Bergson died of pneumonia in occupied Paris, which he supposedly contracted after standing in a queue for several hours in order to register as a Jew.
1941 – Kurt Grelling was killed by the Nazis.
1941 – Edith Stein died in a gas chamber in the Auschwitz concentration camp. 
1942 – Georges Politzer was executed by the Nazis.
1943 – Simone Weil starved herself to death.
1944 – Jean Cavaillès was shot by the Gestapo.
1944 – Marc Bloch was shot by the Gestapo for his work in the French Resistance.
1944 – Giovanni Gentile was murdered by communist partisans.
1945 – Dietrich Bonhoeffer was executed by hanging.
1945 – Gerhard Gentzen was detained in a prison camp by the Russian forces, where he died of malnutrition.
1945 – Ernst Bergmann committed suicide after the Allied forces captured Leipzig.
1945 – Johan Huizinga died in De Steeg in Gelderland, near Arnhem, where he was held in detention by the Nazis.
1945 – Miki Kiyoshi died in prison; he had been imprisoned after helping a friend on the run from the authorities.
1948 – Mohandas Gandhi was shot and killed by a Hindu zealot.
1951 – Ludwig Wittgenstein died of cancer in Ireland, three days after his 62nd birthday. His last words: "Tell them I've had a wonderful life."
1954 – Alan Turing ate a cyanide-poisoned apple. He was believed at the time to have committed suicide due to chemical depression, but his death was possibly just an accident.
1960 – Albert Camus died in an automobile accident.
1961 – Maurice Merleau-Ponty died of a stroke while preparing a lecture on Descartes.
1969 – Theodor Adorno developed heart palpitations after attempting to climb a 3000-metre mountain, and subsequently suffered a heart attack.
1970 – Bertrand Russell died of the flu in Wales. There was no religious ceremony.
1971 – Richard Montague was beaten to death, presumably by a male prostitute.
1973 – Amílcar Cabral was assassinated while fighting for the independence of Portuguese colonies in Africa.
1977 – Jan Patočka died of an apoplexy after having been interrogated by the Czechoslovak secret police for eleven hours.
1978 – Kurt Gödel starved himself to death by refusing to eat for fear of being poisoned.
1979 – Evald Ilyenkov committed suicide.
1979 – Nicos Poulantzas committed suicide by jumping out of the twentieth floor of an apartment building.
1980 – Roland Barthes was struck in the street by a laundry van after leaving a luncheon with French President François Mitterrand.
1980 – Jean-Paul Sartre, a notorious chain-smoker, died of an edema of the lung.
1983 – Arthur Koestler committed joint suicide with his third wife, Cynthia, by taking an overdose of drugs after a painful struggle with disease.
1984 – Michel Foucault was the first high-profile French personality to die of AIDS after contracting HIV.
1986 – Simone de Beauvoir died of pneumonia.
1990 – Louis Althusser died of a heart attack.
1992 – Félix Guattari died of a heart attack.
1994 – David Stove committed suicide by hanging himself after a painful struggle with disease.
1994 – Sarah Kofman committed suicide on Nietzsche’s birthday.
1994 – Guy Debord committed suicide by shooting himself after a painful struggle with polyneuritis.
1995 – Gilles Deleuze committed suicide by jumping out of his fourth-story apartment window.
1998 – Dimitris Liantinis committed suicide on the mountains of Taygetos.
2000 – Willard Van Orman Quine died of Alzheimer's disease.
2001 – David Lewis died of diabetes related complications.
2004 – Jacques Derrida died of pancreatic cancer.
2007 – André Gorz committed joint suicide with his wife by lethal injection.
2017 – Anne Dufourmantelle drowned while trying to rescue two children.
2017 – Mark Fisher committed suicide by hanging.
2019 – Ágnes Heller drowned in Lake Balaton near Balatonalmádi while she was swimming.
2020 – Bernard Stiegler committed suicide.
2022 - Saul Kripke died of pancreatic cancer.

References

Further reading
 Ava Chitwood, Death by Philosophy, University of Michigan Press, 2004.
 Simon Critchley, Book of Dead Philosophers, Vintage, 2009.
 David Palfrey, "How Philosophers Die", British Academy Review, Issue 10 (2007)
 Anthony Quinton, 'Deaths of philosophers', The Oxford Companion to Philosophy, Oxford, 1995, 2005.

Philosophers
Lists of philosophers